"Fury of the Storm" is the second track from the album Sonic Firestorm by power metal band DragonForce. Released in 2004, it failed to appear on any of the major record charts. It was a promo single, and the band's second overall single.

This song is seen in Guitar Hero: Warriors of Rock.

References

DragonForce songs
2004 singles
2005 songs
Capitol Records singles
Songs written by Sam Totman